Diego Aroldo Cabrera Flores (born August 13, 1982, in Santa Cruz de la Sierra) is a Bolivian football striker. He currently plays for Always Ready.

Club career
He played at club level for Oriente Petrolero, Blooming, Bolívar, The Strongest, Aurora, Universitario de Sucre and Guabirá in Bolivia, as well as Cerro Porteño from Paraguay. He also spent a couple of years in the Colombian Professional League with Cúcuta Deportivo, Independiente Medellín, Deportivo Pasto, Deportes Tolima and Itagüí.

In 2007 Cabrera was elected as the "Football Player of the Year" by the Bolivian sports media, thanks to the impressive displays he had while playing for Cúcuta Deportivo.

In 2009, he was loaned to Independiente Medellín. During the first semester Cabrera had great performances in both, the domestic tournament and Copa Libertadores. However, due to some differences with his coach, he decided to leave the club.

In early 2012 Cabrera joined Bogota's Independiente Santa Fe. In July of the year he helped the club win the Apertura Tournament, the first in 34 years for Santa Fe. In January 2013, Cabrera made his return to the Bolivian league after joining San José.

International career
He has earned 22 caps for the Bolivia national team. Cabrera scored his first international goal in a friendly match against Panama on August 20, 2008. He represented his country in 12 FIFA World Cup qualification matches.

References

External links
 
 
 

1982 births
Living people
Sportspeople from Santa Cruz de la Sierra
Association football forwards
Bolivian footballers
Bolivia international footballers
Bolivian expatriate footballers
2007 Copa América players
Oriente Petrolero players
Club Blooming players
The Strongest players
Cerro Porteño players
Club Bolívar players
Club Aurora players
Cúcuta Deportivo footballers
Independiente Medellín footballers
Deportivo Pasto footballers
Deportes Tolima footballers
Independiente Santa Fe footballers
Club San José players
Águilas Doradas Rionegro players
Guabirá players
Universitario de Sucre footballers
Deportivo Capiatá players
Categoría Primera A players
Paraguayan Primera División players
Expatriate footballers in Colombia
Expatriate footballers in Paraguay
Bolivian expatriate sportspeople in Colombia
Bolivian expatriate sportspeople in Paraguay
Club Always Ready players
Universitario de Sucre managers